is a former Japanese football player.

Playing career
Kazuki Ito was played for Arte Takasaki and YSCC Yokohama from 2010 to 2014.

References

External links

1987 births
Living people
Tokai University alumni
Association football people from Chiba Prefecture
Japanese footballers
J3 League players
Japan Football League players
Arte Takasaki players
YSCC Yokohama players
Association football forwards